Shiloh Township is one of sixteen townships in Jefferson County, Illinois, USA.  As of the 2010 census, its population was 6,620 and it contained 3,204 housing units.

Geography
The township is centered at 38°21′N 88°59′W (38.344,-88.982). It is transversed north–south by Interstate Route 57 and east–west by Interstate Route 64 and State Route 15.

Cities, towns, villages
 Mount Vernon (west portion)
 Woodlawn (east half)

Unincorporated towns
 Drivers at 
 Webster Hill Estates at 
(This list is based on USGS data and may include former settlements.)

Adjacent townships
 Rome Township (north)
 Field Township (northeast)
 Mt. Vernon Township (east)
 Dodds Township (southeast)
 McClellan Township (south)
 Casner Township (west)
 Grand Prairie Township (northwest)

Cemeteries
The township contains these nine cemeteries: Memorial Garden, New Shiloh, Oddfellows, Old Shiloh, Pleasant Grove, Reynolds, Slade, Sunset Memorial and West Salem.

Major highways
  Interstate 57
  Interstate 64
  Illinois Route 15

Airports and landing strips
 Mount Vernon Bullock Heliport

Lakes
 Peckerwood Lake

Demographics

Political districts
 Illinois' 19th congressional district
 State House District 107
 State Senate District 54

References
 
 United States Census Bureau 2007 TIGER/Line Shapefiles
 United States National Atlas

External links
 City-Data.com
 Illinois State Archives

Townships in Jefferson County, Illinois
Mount Vernon, Illinois micropolitan area
Townships in Illinois